Buccinaria guacoldae is an extinct species of sea snail, a marine gastropod mollusk in the family Raphitomidae.

Description

Distribution
Fossils of this marine species were found in Miocene strata of Navidad Formation, Chile.

References

External links
 Nielsen, S.N. (2003) Die marinen Gastropoden (exklusive Heterostropha) aus dem Miozän von Zentralchile. Universität Hamburg

guacoldae
Gastropods described in 2003